Nawaminthrachinuthit Triam Udomsuksa Pattanakarn School, commonly abbreviated as Nawamin Triampat, is a high school located in Bang Bo, Samut Prakan, Thailand It admits lower-secondary and upper-secondary students (mathayom 1–6, equivalent to grades 7–12). Founded in 1978 as a campus school of Triam Udom Suksa Pattanakarn School, Bangkok, Thailand.The school has five permanent buildings. There are six levels M 1-6 (Grade 7–12).

Buildings

Programs 
Junior high school 

High school

External links 
 School Official Website
 NMR.T.U.P. Student Committee
 NMR.T.U.P. Audio Visual

Schools in Thailand
Buildings and structures in Samut Prakan province
Education in Samutprakan province
Educational institutions established in 1992
1992 establishments in Thailand